is a railway station on the Keisei Main Line in Adachi, Tokyo, Japan, operated by the private railway operator Keisei Electric Railway.

Lines 

Layout
This station consists of two island platforms serving four tracks.

Platforms

History
The station opened on 19 December 1931.

Station numbering was introduced to all Keisei Line stations on 17 June 2010. Senjuōhashi was assigned station number KS05.

Surrounding area
 Tokyo University of the Arts

See also
 List of railway stations in Japan

References

External links

  

Railway stations in Japan opened in 1931
Railway stations in Tokyo
Keisei Main Line